Symphony in Effect is the debut album of Canadian rapper Maestro Fresh-Wes, released in 1989 on Attic/LMR Records. In Canada, the album was certified platinum and was the second-best selling Cancon album in Canada of 1990. It remains one of the best-selling Canadian hip hop albums of all time. The first single "Let Your Backbone Slide" became the first hit single in Canadian hip hop history, and appeared on Billboard's Hot Rap Singles chart. A second single, "Drop the Needle", was released in 1990.

Background
After making his radio debut on Toronto's CKLN in 1983, Maestro formed the Vision Crew with Ebony MC. The duo opened for hip-hop acts such as Public Enemy, Ice-T, and Beastie Boys before breaking up in 1987. Originally known as Melody MC, he changed his alias to Maestro Fresh-Wes in 1988 and released the independent demos You Can't Stop Us Now and "I'm Showin' You", which featured his new DJ, LTD. The next year, he performed at the New Music Seminar in New York City, where he walked away with a record deal with independent label LeFrak-Moelis Records (LMR). Later that year, he released Symphony in Effect which included "I'm Showin' You" and "Just Swingin'", featuring his friend Ebony MC. Maestro's manager Farley Flex also made an appearance on the track "LTD's on the Wheel(s) of Fortune".

Reception

The album was successful in Canada, with 190,000 copies sold, nearly going double platinum. It peaked at #4 on Canada's RPM Albums Chart. RapReviews.com gave it a 7/10 rating, stating "Maestro Fresh-Wes was exactly the right rapper to put Canadian hip-hop on the map." The album won the first Juno Award for Rap Recording of the Year in 1991.

Track listing

† Maximum 60 is incorrectly credited as the producer of "Let Your Backbone Slide".

Samples
"Drop the Needle" – Contains a sample of "Dance Desire" by Haywire
"The Mic's My Piece – Contains a sample of "The Mexican" by Babe Ruth
"I'm Showin' You" – Contains samples of "Love Rollercoaster" by Ohio Players and "So Ruff, So Tuff" by Roger Troutman
"Let Your Backbone Slide" – Contains samples of "The Champ" by The Mohawks, "Funky Drummer" by James Brown, "Set It Off" by Strafe, "La Di Da Di" by Doug E. Fresh and Slick Rick, "One, Two, Three" by The B-Boys, and "Rebel Without a Pause" by Public Enemy
"The Maestro" – Contains a sample of "Bring It Here" by Wild Sugar
"Tear It Up" - Contains a sample of "The Lovomaniacs (Sex)" by Boobie Knight & The Universal Lady

Chart positions
Album

Singles

References

1989 debut albums
Maestro Fresh-Wes albums
Attic Records albums
Juno Award for Rap Recording of the Year recordings